Manubolu is a village and a Mandal in Nellore district in the state of Andhra Pradesh in India.

Geography
It has an average elevation of 9 meters (32 feet).

References 

Villages in Nellore district